Edgartown is a tourist destination on the island of Martha's Vineyard in Dukes County, Massachusetts, United States, for which it is the county seat.
 
It was once a major whaling port, with historic houses that have been carefully preserved. Today it hosts yachting events around its large harbour. It includes the smaller island of Chappaquiddick.
 
Edgartown is a part of Massachusetts's 9th congressional district, represented in the Massachusetts Senate as a portion of the Cape and Islands district. The town's population was 5,168 at the 2020 census.

History 

In 1642, Rev. Thomas Mayhew, Jr. led a group of families to start a colony on the island after its purchase by his father Thomas Mayhew. Originally called Great Harbor, it was incorporated on July 8, 1671, as Edgar Towne, named for Edgar, whose father James II of England, was heir presumptive to the English throne. Those who chose the name to honor the monarchy did not know Edgar had died at the age of three on June 8, 1671. It was one of the two original towns on Martha's Vineyard, along with Tisbury, incorporated at the same time.

The younger Mayhew began his work which led to his becoming the first church planting Protestant missionary after he settled in Edgartown. A Wampanoag Indian named Hiacoomes who lived nearby became his partner in founding the churches in the Indian communities.

Edgartown was one of the primary ports for the whaling industry during the 1800s. Ships from all over the world would dock in its sheltered bay and captains would build grand mansions for their families with ornate top floor rooms called widow's walks, which overlooked the harbor. A myth developed that wives would watch for months from these tiny rooms, hoping to see the sails of ships that would bring their husbands home from the sea. There is little or no evidence that widow's walks were intended or regularly used for this purpose. They were frequently built around the chimney of the residence, thus creating an easy access route to the structure, allowing the residents of the home to pour sand down burning chimneys in the event of a chimney fire in the hopes of preventing the house from burning down.

As more economical alternatives became available the whaling industry began to decline. By the beginning of the 20th century, its influence on the tiny town which had made its fortunes through the industry, was ended.  Today the town is more known for tourism, as well as the site of Chappaquiddick, where Ted Kennedy's fatal automobile accident took place in 1969.

Tourism 

Edgartown was an old whaling port and is now a summer and tourist destination with a multitude of houses built by whaling captains and other prominent people of prior centuries. The growth of the population over the past 25 years has led to a period of intense renewal of these old houses. Water Street along the harbor is the location of many of these "Captain's Homes" which line both sides of the street. The town has also encouraged renovation of historical structures. As part of this effort, the Whaling Church, a large 18th-century church, has been converted to a performing arts center and the adjacent Daniel Fisher House is now used for a variety of social functions. In addition to the architecture of the town, Edgartown is easily traversed on foot or bicycle, making it attractive to tourists.

Edgartown was used as the main shooting location for the town of Amity in Steven Spielberg's 1975 blockbuster Jaws. Many landmarks and buildings in Edgartown that were filmed in the movie can still be seen today.
 
The Edgartown Harbor Light at the end of north Water Street defines the entrance to the Harbor. The harbor is large and entered through a modest sized channel on the North side of Edgartown. It opens into Katama Bay, created by a barrier beach that sometimes connects the south end of Chappaquiddick to the remainder of Edgartown, The barrier beach opened during a spring storm in 2007. This has led to a 3 knot current through Katama Bay and Edgartown Harbor. This protected body of water provides ample mooring for small and large boats. The opening of the harbor will accommodate large sailing and motorized boats, but will not accommodate large ships or yachts which may anchor outside the harbor.

Another feature is South Beach, a small part of the ocean beach that runs the entire southern length of the island from Edgartown to Aquinnah. It can be reached by driving or riding the bus south from Edgartown center for approximately 2.5 miles. South Beach is a crashing ocean beach. It is a major destination for tourists. Much of the beach in Edgartown is open to the public with ample parking available. The section of the beach near Katama is often crowded, while the sections further to the west (near Edgartown Great Pond and Oyster Pond) are often less so.

Geography
Edgartown is ranked 103rd out of 351 communities in the Commonwealth by land area, and is the largest town by land area in Dukes County. Edgartown is bordered by Nantucket Sound to the northeast and east, the Atlantic Ocean to the south, West Tisbury to the west, and Oak Bluffs to the north. The town also shares a common corner with Tisbury (along with West Tisbury and Oak Bluffs).  

Edgartown is located at the eastern end of Martha's Vineyard (referred to as "down-island", a vestige of the island's traditional maritime manner of speaking in that as a ship travels east, it is said to be traveling "down east" as longitude decreases towards the Prime Meridian). [An alternative explanation and one prevalent in Maine, is that down east is down wind in the prevailing winds of the New England coast, down island would also be down wind. For those who have spent a lot of time sailing (as opposed to 'power boating'), down wind is more important to a sailor than decreasing longitude.]

The town of Edgartown includes the smaller island of Chappaquiddick, sometimes connected to the rest of Martha'a Vineyard only by a barrier beach which can be breached during storms. Chappaquiddick is separated from the town center by Edgartown Harbor and Katama Bay. The town is close to Nantucket's Muskeget Island, which is seven miles east of Wasque Point, the southeasternmost point of Chappaquiddick.

Katama is the south-central portion of Edgartown. In addition to a beach, Katama has within its boundaries the Katama Airpark, the Katama Farm, the Herring Creek Farm and two resorts. Edgartown is also home to half of the Manuel F. Correllus State Forest, which extends into neighboring West Tisbury.  There are nine beaches, a yacht club, and several preserves and reservations in the town, including the Wasque Reservation along the south shore of Chappaquiddick and the Cape Pogue Wildlife Refuge along the east shore of the island. There are two lighthouses in the town, the Cape Pogue Light on Chappaquiddick and the Edgartown Harbor Light in Edgartown Harbor.

Climate
Edgartown has a humid subtropical climate (Köppen Cfa) according to most recent temperature averages, with some resemblance to that of Tampa, Florida, New York City, or Atlanta, Georgia, although the climate more resembles far inland Central Europe. Winters are mild with occasional snow and summers are hot and humid. Edgartown is among the most northerly locations with a semi-tropical climate in North America. 

Diurnal temperature variation is lower than on the mainland. When wind conditions come from the cold interior during winter, Edgartown can experience heavy cold snaps in spite of its offshore position and low latitude. Even with  average January highs and the mild water temperatures, ice days were recorded every year at the station in its first 75 years operating.

Transportation

Auto transportation to Chappaquiddick is provided by two ferries, the "On Time II" and "On Time III". A common myth is that the original ferry "On Time"  was given its name because the ferry has never had scheduled runs and thus is never late. In fact, the ferry was given this name because a new owner, Foster B. Silva of Chappaquiddick, had less than two weeks to build it before taking over the service on August 1, 1948. The work crew—led by Captain Samuel B. Norton and master boatbuilder Manuel Swartz Roberts, both of Edgartown—built and launched the new ferry "on time." This original "On Time" was converted to a barge dispensing fresh water to visiting yachtsmen after its service as a ferry ended in 1975. The barge was sold and lost track of in the late 1990s. The "On Time II," built in 1969, and the "On Time III," built in 1975 and now owned by Peter. S. Wells and his wife Sally T. Snipes of Chappaquiddick, are still in service.

In addition to the On Time Ferry, Edgartown is home to another ferry, the Pied Piper, which runs seasonally between the town and Falmouth, on Cape Cod.  There are two airports in the town. Katama Airpark is a grass field and located between Katama Bay and Edgartown Great Pond in the southern part of town; it serves smaller private aircraft.  Along the border of the state forest lies Martha's Vineyard Airport, which Edgartown shares with West Tisbury.  This airport is used for commercial commuter flights from nearby sites on the mainland and Nantucket.

Demographics

2020 Census

Note: the US Census treats Hispanic/Latino as an ethnic category. This table excludes Latinos from the racial categories and assigns them to a separate category. Hispanics/Latinos can be of any race.

2000 Census
As of the census of 2000, there were 3,779 people, 1,582 households, and 957 families residing in the town. The racial makeup of the town was 93.3% White, 1.8% African American, 0.5% Native American, 0.5% Asian, <0.1% Pacific Islander, 1.5% from other races, and 2.3% from two or more races. Hispanic or Latino of any race were 1.2% of the population.

There were 1,582 households, out of which 28.3% had children under the age of 18 living with them, 47.7% were married couples living together, 8.6% had a female householder with no husband present, and 39.5% were non-families. 30.1% of all households were made up of individuals, and 10.3% had someone living alone who was 65 years of age or older.  The average household size was 2.35 and the average family size was 2.92.

In the town, the population was spread out, with 22.3% under the age of 18, 5.8% from 18 to 24, 30.9% from 25 to 44, 28.3% from 45 to 64, and 12.6% who were 65 years of age or older.  The median age was 40 years. For every 100 females, there were 102.4 males.  For every 100 females age 18 and over, there were 99.2 males.

The median income for a household in the town was $50,407, and the median income for a family was $55,153. Males had a median income of $36,615 versus $30,205 for females. The per capita income for the town was $25,740.  About 2.7% of families and 4.2% of the population were below the poverty line, including 2.5% of those under age 18 and 1.3% of those age 65 or over.

In 2003 the Vineyard Gazette estimated that there were 15,000 year-round inhabitants of the island with a summer increase to 105,000.  Over the last 20 years there has been a continuous growth in the population of the island, although many of the large expanses of undeveloped land and many vistas remain. The summer season, which previously lasted from mid-June through Labor Day weekend has been gradually extended and now includes the period from Memorial Day through Columbus Day.

Government 

Edgartown is the county seat of Dukes County.

On the national level, Edgartown is a part of Massachusetts's 9th congressional district, and is currently represented by William R. Keating.  The state's junior (Class II) member of the United States Senate is Ed Markey, and the senior (Class I) Senator is Elizabeth Warren.

On the state level, Edgartown is represented in the Massachusetts House of Representatives as a part of the Barnstable, Dukes and Nantucket district, which includes all of Martha's Vineyard and Nantucket, as well as a portion of Falmouth.  The town is represented in the Massachusetts Senate as a portion of the Cape and Islands district, which includes all of Martha's Vineyard, Nantucket and most of Barnstable County (with the exception of Bourne, Sandwich, Falmouth and a portion of Barnstable).  All of Dukes County is patrolled by the Fifth (Oak Bluffs) Barracks of Troop D of the Massachusetts State Police.

Edgartown is governed on the local level by the open town meeting form of government and is led by a Town Administrator and a board of selectmen.  The town has its own police and fire departments, both located just west of the historic center of town. The current police chief is Bruce McNamee. The town has one post office, located further west and south of the wildlife preserve at Sengekontacket Pond.  The town's Free Public Library is located in the center of town.  Edgartown is also the site of the Dukes County Courthouse, the only courthouse on the island.

Education 

Edgartown is part of the Martha's Vineyard Regional School District along with Aquinnah, Chilmark, Oak Bluffs, Tisbury, and West Tisbury. Students in Edgartown attend Edgartown Elementary School, from grades K–8. High School students then attend Martha's Vineyard Regional High School. The MVRHS's teams are nicknamed the Vineyarders, and their colors are violet and white.  The school has a longstanding rivalry with Nantucket High School, with both competing for the Island Cup on an annual basis.

Notable people
Helen Jernegan
 Ruth Gordon
 Enid Yandell
 Patricia Neal

See also 
 Edgartown Yacht Club

References

External links

 Official Web Site of Edgartown
 The Edgartown Yacht Club
 Edgartown Public Library
 Edgartown Police Department
 Edgartown School

 
County seats in Massachusetts
Geography of Martha's Vineyard
Populated coastal places in Massachusetts
Towns in Dukes County, Massachusetts
Populated places established in 1642
Towns in Massachusetts